Starksia lepidogaster, the scalybelly blenny, is a species of labrisomid blenny endemic to the Tres Marias Islands off the Pacific coast of Mexico.

References

lepidogaster
Fish described in 1971
Taxa named by Richard Heinrich Rosenblatt